Carmelo José González Jiménez (born 9 July 1983), known simply as Carmelo, is a Spanish footballer who plays as an attacking midfielder.

He spent most of his professional career with Las Palmas, Sporting de Gijón (competing in La Liga with both clubs) and in the Thai Premier League.

Club career
Born in Las Palmas, Canary Islands, Carmelo graduated from hometown UD Las Palmas' youth ranks. In his first appearance with the main squad, in 2001–02's La Liga, he scored in a 3–0 away win against RCD Mallorca on 26 August 2001, and would play a further three seasons with the club in the second (two) and third divisions (one).

Carmelo joined Levante UD in 2005–06 on a four-year contract, where he would be a key figure in the Valencian Community side's promotion to the top level. He appeared in only six matches the following campaign, finishing it with Hércules CF on loan.

In 2007–08, Carmelo moved to CD Numancia still owned by Levante, scoring seven goals (third-best in squad) en route to another top-flight promotion. He then switched the next season to another promotee, Sporting de Gijón, netting in back-to-back wins in October against Mallorca, CA Osasuna and Deportivo de La Coruña as the Asturians retained their league status.

In the following three seasons, Carmelo struggled with injury but managed to be relatively used, only being able to score once in a combined 58 games however. The club suffered relegation at the end of the 2011–12 campaign.

Carmelo left Sporting in February 2013, moving abroad for the first time shortly after as he signed with Thai Premier League's Buriram United FC. He won the national championship in his first year, being top scorer in the process.

In early July 2016, aged 33, Carmelo switched countries and joined Al-Ittihad Kalba SC in the UAE Football League. The following season, he returned to his homeland and signed with Arucas CF in the Canarian regional divisions.

Club statistics

Honours
Numancia
Segunda División: 2007–08

Buriram United
Thai Premier League: 2013, 2014
Thai FA Cup: 2013
Thai League Cup: 2013
Kor Royal Cup: 2013, 2014

Spain U17
Meridian Cup: 2001

Spain U19
UEFA European Championship: 2002

Individual
Thai Premier League Top Scorer: 2013

References

External links

1983 births
Living people
Footballers from Las Palmas
Spanish footballers
Association football midfielders
La Liga players
Segunda División players
Segunda División B players
UD Las Palmas Atlético players
UD Las Palmas players
Levante UD footballers
Hércules CF players
CD Numancia players
Sporting de Gijón players
Thai League 1 players
Buriram United F.C. players
UAE Pro League players
Al-Ittihad Kalba SC players
Spain youth international footballers
Spain under-21 international footballers
Spanish expatriate footballers
Expatriate footballers in Thailand
Expatriate footballers in the United Arab Emirates
Spanish expatriate sportspeople in Thailand
Spanish expatriate sportspeople in the United Arab Emirates